Torres Torres is a municipality in the comarca of Camp de Morvedre in the Valencian Community, Spain.

References

Municipalities in the Province of Valencia
Camp de Morvedre